Anil Chaudhary is an Indian politician from Delhi. He served as member of Delhi Legislative Assembly who represented Patparganj Assembly constituency. He is currently serving as the President of Delhi Pradesh Congress Committee. He is the former President of Delhi Pradesh Youth Congress.

Position held

References

Living people
20th-century Indian politicians
Indian National Congress politicians from Delhi
Presidents of Delhi Pradesh Congress Committee
1976 births